Terry Matlock (born November 27, 1962) is an American politician who served in the Oklahoma House of Representatives from the 1st district from 1990 to 2002.

References

1962 births
Living people
Democratic Party members of the Oklahoma House of Representatives